Donald C. Jefferson (August 15, 1895 – April 17, 1994) was an American Negro league catcher in the 1920s.

A native of Middleport, Ohio, Jefferson attended Ohio State University. He played for the Dayton Marcos in 1920, and for the Pittsburgh Keystones the following season. Jefferson died in Pittsburgh, Pennsylvania in 1994 at age 98.

References

External links
 and Seamheads

1895 births
1994 deaths
Dayton Marcos players
Pittsburgh Keystones players
20th-century African-American sportspeople